The Grabow Altarpiece (also known as the Petri Altar) was painted by Master Bertram around 1379–1383. Originally located in St. Petri church, it is now in the Hamburger Kunsthalle in Hamburg, Germany.

It includes the earliest known depiction of the Rest on the Flight into Egypt 
(lower row, last section on the right).

References

External links 
Hamburger Kunsthalle webpage showing the full altarpiece (main image, exterior description, interior description)

Gothic paintings
1380s works
Paintings depicting the Annunciation
Paintings depicting Jesus
Paintings depicting Adam and Eve
Altarpieces
Paintings depicting the Flight into Egypt
Angels in art
Paintings in the Hamburger Kunsthalle